Hootsuite is a social media management platform, created by Ryan Holmes in 2008. The system's user interface takes the form of a dashboard, and supports social network integrations for Twitter, Facebook, Instagram, LinkedIn, Pinterest, YouTube and TikTok.

Based in Vancouver, Hootsuite has close to 1,000 staff members in 13 locations, including Toronto, London, Paris, Sydney, Bucharest, Milan, Rome and Mexico City. The company has more than 16 million users in over 175 countries.

History
In 2008, Holmes needed a tool to manage multiple social media networks at his digital services agency, Invoke Media. Finding that there was no product in the market offering all the features he sought, Holmes, along with Dario Meli, David Tedman, and the Invoke team, chose instead to develop a platform of their own that would be able to organize their many social media accounts and networks. The first iteration of this social media management system launched on November 28, 2008 in the form of a Twitter dashboard called BrightKit.

Recognizing that many other individuals and organizations across the world were facing similar problems with managing multiple social accounts, Holmes decided that BrightKit could be the solution for other businesses also looking to organize their own social networks. The launch of BrightKit had a very positive reception, thanks to its clean interface and publishing capabilities.

In February 2009, Holmes offered a $500 prize for renaming the platform, and used crowdsourced suggestions from the dashboard's 100,000+ users as contest submissions. The winning idea was Hootsuite, a moniker submitted by a user named Matt Nathan and based upon "Owly", the dashboard's owl logo, as a word play on the French expression "tout de suite", meaning "right now".

In November 2009, the Hootsuite dashboard expanded its offering to support Facebook and LinkedIn, and the capability to use Twitter Lists.

In December 2009, Hootsuite spun off from Invoke Media and launched officially as an independent company, Hootsuite Media, Inc. That same month, Hootsuite received $1.9 million in funding from Hearst Interactive Media, Blumberg Capital, and prominent angel investors Leo Group LLC and Geoff Entress.

In March 2012, OMERS Ventures, the venture capital investment arm of the Ontario Municipal Employees Retirement System, invested $20 million, valuing the company at US$200 million. OMERS did not buy its stake directly in the company, but rather bought private shares in a secondary transaction from a handful of employees and early investors, said Holmes.

In May 2012, Hootsuite subsequently raised US$50 million in a Series A round, following rumours.

In September 2012, Hootsuite acquired Seesmic, a customer relationship management system and competitor.

On August 1, 2013, the company announced that it had raised US$165 million in Series B funding from Insight Venture Partners, followed by Accel Partners and OMERS—all three will now have a seat on Hootsuite's board. Holmes also said the company was looking to make at least two unnamed acquisitions, in addition to employing 100 overseas employees.

In 2016 AdEspresso grew to $4.8 million in revenue, up 60% from $3 million in 2015. As of 2016 AdEspresso has 35 employees and 4,000 customers.

In February 2017, Hootsuite announced its acquisition of AdEspresso, a digital advertisement manager, and LiftMetrix, a leading social media analytics company.

In March 2018, Hootsuite announced $50 million in growth capital from CIBC Innovation Banking.

In January 2021, Hootsuite acquired Sparkcentral, a messaging customer engagement tool and competitor for an undisclosed price.

Service
The service is commonly used to manage online brands and to submit messages to a variety of social media services, including Twitter, Facebook, Instagram, LinkedIn and TikTok.  Companies and organizations known to use Hootsuite include Facebook, the Obama administration, HBO, Martha Stewart Media, Virgin Group, SXSW, Panasonic, Zappos, The Gap and LHC. Hootsuite provides a browser-based dashboard that allows users to keep updated on their Twitter account.

Business
The company behind the service is based in Vancouver, British Columbia, Canada. Its business strategy allows users free basic service with payment for additional features.

In January 2010, the Hootsuite company was spun out of Invoke Media after venture capital firms Blumberg Capital and Hearst Interactive Media raised $2 million in financing for the company.  Localized versions of Hootsuite are available in Japanese, Spanish, Portuguese, and German, and 50 more languages are planned to be added. Hootsuite's team continues to contact media organizations to help them manage their online brands, by meeting with groups such as Time Inc. and its subsidiary magazines, including People, InStyle, and This Old House.

As of June 2010, the service managed over one million social media accounts for 400,000 unique users.

Reception
The Hootsuite software has won awards from Mashable at their Open Web Awards 2009, and the Canadian New Media Award. the Shorty Awards,

Controversies 
In September 2020, Hootsuite came under widespread criticism over its agreement with U.S. Immigration and Customs Enforcement, made mere weeks after allegations of forced hysterectomies at ICE detention centres surfaced. Following public pressure, the company backed out of the deal, and posted a lengthy statement from CEO Tom Keiser to their official Twitter account that expressed regret over the internal divisions that the contract had created within the company. Despite this public distancing from its earlier decision, the company terminated an employee who had acted as whistleblower in bringing the contract's existence to light.

In October, it was claimed that the contract had been transferred to rival company NUVI, leading to uncertainty about the actual fate of the contract.

See also
 Dashboard (business)

References

Further reading
 "Hootsuite for President, Obama that is" at The Vancouver Sun

External links
 Official Website

2008 establishments in British Columbia
B Lab-certified corporations
Canadian companies established in 2008
Canadian social networking websites
Companies based in Vancouver
Email marketing software
Internet properties established in 2008
Multinational companies headquartered in Canada
Technology companies of Canada
Twitter services and applications
Social media management platforms